Mutineer is the ninth studio album by American singer-songwriter Warren Zevon. The album was released on May 23, 1995, by Giant. The album largely consisted of home recordings. Bob Dylan covered "Mutineer" a number of times in concert after Zevon's passing.

Track listing
All tracks composed by Warren Zevon, except where indicated.

Personnel
Warren Zevon – vocals, guitar, piano, keyboards, percussion
Peter Asher – additional vocals on "The Indifference of Heaven"
Rosemary Butler – additional vocals on "Jesus Was a Cross Maker" and "Mutineer"
Jorge Calderón – bass guitar on "Seminole Bingo", additional vocals on "Poisonous Lookalike"
Bruce Hornsby – accordion on "Piano Fighter" and "Monkey Wash Donkey Rinse"
Larry Klein – bass on "Rottweiler Blues" and "Mutineer"
David Lindley – fiddle and cittern on "Poisonous Lookalike"; fiddle on "Monkey Wash Donkey Rinse"
Michael Wolff – keyboards on "Similar to Rain"

Production
Producer: Warren Zevon
Engineer: Duncan Aldrich

References

Warren Zevon albums
1995 albums
Giant Records (Warner) albums